Wheat is a 2009 Chinese historical drama film directed by He Ping, starring Fan Bingbing, Huang Jue, Du Jiayi, Wang Xueqi and Wang Zhiwen. The film tells the story of women left behind when their husbands went to war.

The film was produced for US$6 million and was funded by He Ping's own Beijing Classic Culture, along with Polybona Films, and the state-backed Xi'an Film Studio.

Cast
Fan Bingbing as Li
Huang Jue as Xia
Du Jiayi as Zhe
Wang Xueqi as Lord Ju Cong
Wang Zhiwen as Chong
Wang Ji
Li Ge
Sun Guitian
Wang Jiajia as Yan

Release
Filmed in 2008, Wheat premiered on June 13, 2009, as the opening film to the 2009 Shanghai International Film Festival.

References

External links

2009 films
2000s historical drama films
2000s Mandarin-language films
Wheat
Films set in the Warring States period
Films directed by He Ping
Chinese historical drama films
2009 drama films